Liangshan Yuanguan was a Zen Buddhist monk during the Five Dynasties and Ten Kingdoms period. His first appearance in the historical record is in the Transmission of the Lamp, which was compiled around 1004. No precise dates are available for when he lived, and information about his life is scant.

References

Chan Buddhist monks
Tang dynasty Buddhist monks
Five Dynasties and Ten Kingdoms Buddhist monks
Five Dynasties and Ten Kingdoms people born during Tang